AMI-télé is a Canadian, French-language digital cable specialty channel owned by the non-profit organization Accessible Media Inc. (AMI). AMI-télé is a French version of AMI's English-language service AMI-tv, and broadcasts a selection of general entertainment programming with accommodations for those who are visually or hearing impaired, consisting of described video on the primary audio track and closed captioning available across all of its programming. The channel also broadcasts series on accessibility- and disability-related topics.

AMI-télé is licensed by the Canadian Radio-television and Telecommunications Commission (CRTC) as a Category A "must-carry" service; it must be carried on the lowest level of service by all licensed digital cable, satellite television, and IPTV providers in Canada.

History
In January 2013, when the CRTC opened a new round of applications for must-carry channels, AMI submitted an application for a French-language sister channel of AMI-TV known as AMI-TV Français, which would have a similar format to its English-language counterpart. AMI justified the need for the channel by noting that the three provinces which host the majority of Canada's francophone population—New Brunswick, Ontario, and Quebec—had above-average levels of vision loss and other vision-related conditions. On August 8, 2013, the CRTC approved the application; the CRTC recognized that given the impact of AMI-tv's English service, a French service would have an equivalent impact on Canada's francophone community.

The service launched on December 16, 2014 as AMI-télé in both SD and HD.

References

External links
 AMI-télé 

French-language television stations in Canada
Digital cable television networks in Canada
Television channels and stations established in 2014
Disability mass media
2014 establishments in Ontario
Public television in Canada